Gyula Kállai (1 June 1910 – 12 March 1996) was a Hungarian Communist politician who served as Chairman of the Council of Ministers of the People's Republic of Hungary from 1965 to 1967 and as Speaker of the National Assembly of Hungary 1967–1971. He was President of National Council of the Patriotic People's Front from 1957 to 1989.

In 1957, Kállai visited and questioned Imre Nagy, the former Hungarian prime minister, in exile in Snagov, Romania.  His report led to his ultimate execution. That same year he wrote a pamphlet titled The Counter-Revolution in Hungary the Light of Marxism-Leninism.

References

External links
The Counter-Revolution in Hungary in the Light of Marxism-Leninism

1910 births
1996 deaths
People from Berettyóújfalu
Hungarian Communist Party politicians
Members of the Hungarian Working People's Party
Members of the Hungarian Socialist Workers' Party
Prime Ministers of Hungary
Foreign ministers of Hungary
Education ministers of Hungary
Speakers of the National Assembly of Hungary
Members of the National Assembly of Hungary (1945–1947)
Members of the National Assembly of Hungary (1947–1949)
Members of the National Assembly of Hungary (1949–1953)
Members of the National Assembly of Hungary (1967–1971)